In the Line of Fire is a 1993 American thriller film.

In the Line of Fire may also refer to:

 In the Line of Fire: A Memoir, a 2006 book by former President of Pakistan Pervez Musharraf 
 In the Line of Fire (Hussein Fatal album), 1998
 In the Line of Fire (Robin Trower album), 1990
 In the Line of Fire... Larger Than Live, DragonForce live album, 2015
 In the Line of Fire, a painting by Kuzma Petrov-Vodkin
 "In the Line of Fire", an episode of the British sitcom SunTrap

See also
 Line of Fire (disambiguation)